Bamyan is a city in Afghanistan. It may also refer to:

Bamyan Airport, or Shahid Mazari Airport, Bamyan

Bamyan District, a district in the province
Bamyan Province, a province in Afghanistan, of which Bamyan is the capital

Bamyan University, a university in Bamyan

See also

Buddhas of Bamiyan (Bamyan), two 6th-century statues of Buddha destroyed by the Taliban in the 21st century